Maun may refer to:

Places
 Maun, Botswana, a town
 River Maun, a river in England
 Maun (island), an island in the Adriatic Sea

People
 Caroline Maun (born 1968), American professor, author, poet, lyricist and musician
 Danny Maun (born 1981), English rugby league player
 Ernie Maun (1901–1987), American Major League Baseball pitcher
 Marsal Maun (1913–2000), second Menteri Besar (Chief Minister of Brunei)

See also
 Ma'un, a chapter of the Quran